John Blair Linn Goodwin (1912–1994) was an American author and poet, best known for his story "The Cocoon" (1946), collected in Houghton Mifflin's The Best American Short Stories in 1947. A further short story was "Stone Still, Stone Cold" (1949).

Goodwin was a native of Manhattan and a world traveler. His other works include a children's book titled Freddy Fribbs (Flea); the 1940 children's book The Pleasant Pirate; the 1952 novel The Idols and the Prey, about Haiti; and the 1963 novella A View from Fuji. He died on 12 January 1994 at Columbia-Presbyterian Hospital.

References

1912 births
1994 deaths
20th-century American poets
20th-century American short story writers
Writers from New York (state)